The Valdemar Poulsen Gold Medal, named after radio pioneer Valdemar Poulsen, was awarded each year for outstanding research in the field of radio techniques and related fields by the .  The award was presented on November 23, the anniversary of Poulsen's birth.  The award was discontinued in 1993.

Recipients

 1939 Valdemar Poulsen
 1946 Robert Watson-Watt
 1947 Ernst Alexanderson
 1948 Edward Victor Appleton
 1953 Balthasar van der Pol
 1956 Harald T. Friis
 1958 Hidetsugu Yagi
 1960 Charles P. Ginsburg
 1963 John R. Pierce
 1969 Jay Wright Forrester
 1973 J. B. Gunn
 1976 Andrew Bobeck

References

 

Science and technology awards